The Marshall Time Modulator is an analog delay line-based musical effects device created by Stephen St. Croix that could be used to produce a wide variety of flanging and chorus effects. It was heavily used by the record producer Martin Hannett, who Paul Humphreys has said "used it on everything". Bands who worked with Hannett described it as the "Marshall Time Waster".

References 

Effects units